Dame Temuranga Batley-Jackson  (née Batley; 24 August 1939 – 28 March 2022), known as June Jackson, was a New Zealand Māori activist and public servant.

Biography
She was born Temuranga Batley to Barney and Huinga Batley and grew up in Mahoenui in the King Country. She was a member of the Ngāti Maniapoto tribe. She moved to Wellington in her late teens. There, in 1959, she married Robert "Bob" Jackson, a son of Everard Jackson. Together they had three children, including the politician and broadcaster Willie Jackson. In 1971 they moved from Porirua, in the Wellington region, to Māngere in Auckland.

She was chief executive officer of the Manukau Urban Māori Authority from 1986 to 2009, and a member of the New Zealand Parole Board from 1991 until her death.

In the 1996 Queen's Birthday Honours, Jackson was appointed a Companion of the Queen's Service Order for public services. In the 2010 Birthday Honours, she was appointed Dame Companion of the New Zealand Order of Merit, for services to Māori.

Jackson died in Taumarunui on 28 March 2022 at the age of 82. Her brother-in-law, Moana Jackson, died three days later.

References

1939 births
2022 deaths
New Zealand Māori activists
New Zealand Māori public servants
Ngāti Maniapoto people
20th-century New Zealand public servants
21st-century New Zealand public servants
New Zealand Māori women
Dames Companion of the New Zealand Order of Merit
Companions of the Queen's Service Order
June